Tumaku Paruni Ta Bhuli  is a 2007 Indian Oriya film directed by Chakradhara Sahu.

Plot 
Anu & Ameli are two sisters. Both deeply in love with Sunil. But Sunil loves Anu. When Anu becomes aware of Ameli's love interest with Sunil, she decides to make a sacrifice and compels Sunil to marry Ameli. Anu herself marries Manoj, a local goon to stay away from Sunil & Amile. As usual Manoj starts torturing Anu & her son. In the meantime, when Sunil gets knowledge of Anu's trauma, he comes to rescue Anu from Manoj. In a clash between Sunil & Manoj, when Monaj attempts to kill Sunil, Anu kills Manoj.

Cast
Sunil Kumar
Anu Chowdhury
Amelie Panda
Manoj Misra
Uttam Mohanty
Ashok Das

Awards  
Orissa State Film Awards 2006
Best Director 
Best Supporting Actor  
Best Supporting Actress   
Best Lyrics
Special Jury award

Soundtrack 
The composer of the film is Malay Misra.

References

External links
 

2007 films
2000s Odia-language films